Ellen Gracie Northfleet (born February 16, 1948) is a Brazilian judge. She is the first woman to be appointed to the Supreme Court of Brazil and the Court's first female president.

On August 8, 2011, she retired from the Court, 7 years before the full extension that would go until 70 years old.

There was no formal announcement of her decision to retire and no formal ceremony at her departure.

After her departure the Brazilian Association of Federal Judges published a public statement requesting that a representative of the Federal Magistrature be appointed for her position. Ellen Gracie was not a career magistrate since she did not write the exams to become a Federal Judge, as is the case for members of the Federal Magistrature. She was nominated for the position by then Brazilian president Fernando Henrique Cardoso.

Education 

She earned her LL.B from the Faculty of Law of the Federal University of Rio Grande do Sul in 1970,  and later pursued a graduate degree in Social Anthropology at the same university. Northfleet was also a Fulbright Scholar and assisted in the development of the United States Law Library of Congress Global legal information network project.

Her public career began in 1971, clerking for the Rio Grande do Sul State General Counsel. On November 7, 1973, she joined the Ministério Público Federal, where she remained in the capacity of Federal Prosecutor until 1989, when she first joined the Judiciary, becoming a judge in the Regional Federal Court of the 4th Region, an appeal Court.

Northfleet was appointed to the Supreme Federal Court on November 23, 2000, by then president of Brazil Fernando Henrique Cardoso. She was the first woman to be named to the court.  On March 15, 2006, after her appointment by the president, she was confirmed to head this court  by a vote of its justices.  She replaced Nelson Jobim, who retired on March 30, 2006, presumably to run for office.  She was 58 years of age at the time she was appointed by Fernando Henrique Cardoso.

In May 2006, she came very close to becoming the first acting female president, when Luis Inacio Lula da Silva was travelling abroad. According to Brazilian law, when the President is away from the country the next in succession becomes interim president. However, since elections were drawing near, anyone who occupied the post would be disqualified from running for office, so the vice-president, José Alencar, and the speaker of the house, Aldo Rebelo, the next in succession and who were considering running, also left Brazil.  This would have made her the interim president for at least 10 hours. However, President of the Senate Renan Calheiros, who was not up for re-election and preceded her in the order of succession, stayed behind.

World Justice Project
Northfleet is on the board of directors of the World Justice Project. The World Justice Project works to lead a global, multidisciplinary effort to strengthen the Rule of Law for the development of communities of opportunity and equity. She is also a member of the Inter-American Dialogue.

References

External links

 Roles of Women: Norms and Culture — Ellen Gracie Northfleet,
Judge, Tribunal Regional Federal da 4a Regiao, Porto Alegre, Brazil. (Information from the US Library of Congress.)
 Brazil's First Female Chief Justice to Speak at US Law Schools Annual Meeting, 2 January 2008.

1948 births
Living people
Brazilian people of American descent
Brazilian women in politics
Brazilian women judges
20th-century Brazilian judges
Constitutional court women judges
Election people
Federal University of Rio Grande do Sul alumni
Members of the Inter-American Dialogue
People from Rio de Janeiro (city)
Supreme Federal Court of Brazil justices
Women chief justices
21st-century Brazilian judges
20th-century women judges
21st-century women judges